The men's tournament of water polo at the 2013 Mediterranean Games in Mersin, Turkey, were held between June 19 and June 25. All games were held at the Mersin University, Çiftlikköy Campus Swimming Pool.

Format
Seven teams are divided into two preliminary groups. One group consists three teams and the other four teams.
The top 2 teams from each group will qualify for Semifinals, other teams will qualify for the placement matches.
Winners of the Semifinals contested the gold medal game and the losers the bronze medal game.

Preliminary round
All times are Eastern European Summer Time (UTC+3).

Group A

Group B

Elimination stage

Classification 5–7 bracket

Crossover

Fifth place match

Championship bracket

Semifinals

Bronze medal match

Gold medal match

Final standings

References
Mediterranean Games 2013 Mersin / Turkey, Results, p. 34. 

Mediterranean Games
Water polo at the 2013 Mediterranean Games